The following is a list of events in the year 1982 in Bolivia.

Incumbents 
 President:
 Celso Torrelio (until 19 July 1982)
 Junta of Commanders of the Armed Forces of the Nation (19 July 1982 – 21 July 1982)
 Ángel Mariscal
 Natalio Morales
 Óscar Pammo Rodríguez
 Guido Vildoso (21 July 1982 – 10 October 1982)
 Hernán Siles Zuazo (starting 10 October 1982)
 Vice President:
 Vacant (until 10 October 1982)
 Jaime Paz Zamora (starting 10 October 1982)

Events 
 19 July – President Celso Torrelio resigns from office; the presidency is entrusted to a Junta of Commanders of the Armed Forces while a new executive is selected.
 21 July – Brigadier General Guido Vildoso is appointed president by the military junta.
 10 October – Hernán Siles Zuazo and  Jaime Paz Zamora are sworn in as the constitutional president and vice president of the republic, completing Bolivia's transition back to democracy.

Births 
 10 December – Nadia Cruz, lawyer, acting ombudsman of Bolivia.

Deaths 
 24 January – Alfredo Ovando Candía, 63, 48th president of Bolivia (b. 1918)

References

Footnotes

Bibliography 

 

1982 in Bolivia
Bolivia
Years of the 20th century in Bolivia